The Clot de la Hount or pic du clot de la Hount is a summit of the Pyrenees, located on the Franco-Spanish border in the Vignemale Massif, of which it is the second highest summit in the range, at 3,289 m, after Pique Longue (3,298 m).

Toponymy 
The Clot de la Hount is a term coined by shepherds for the area near the bottom of the peak.
Hount refers to a spring source which flows intermittently (Hount meaning eye, or a passage that is sometimes open, sometimes shut).
Clot means either a ledge or a pen.

Topography 
The French side is located in the Hautes-Pyrénées department, between Cauterets and Gavarnie, in the arrondissement of Argelès-Gazost which lies in the Pyrenees National Park. The southern Spanish side is in the Natural Reserve of Ordesa-Viñamala, in Torla territory, Huesca province.

References 

Mountains of the Pyrenees
Mountains of Hautes-Pyrénées
Pyrenean three-thousanders